Carabus lopatini is a species of beetle from family Carabidae that is endemic to Sakhalin, Russia. They have black body and are shiny.

References

lopatini
Beetles described in 1886
Endemic fauna of Sakhalin
Taxa named by August Morawitz